Matthias Zschokke (October 29, 1954 Bern, Switzerland) is a Swiss writer and filmmaker.

Life
He attended drama school at the Schauspielschule Bochum. Since 1980, he has been living as a writer and filmmaker in Berlin.

He has written nine volumes of prose, eight plays, and three films.

Awards 
 1981 Robert Walser Prize of the city and canton of Bern, for Max
 1983 scholarship from the German Literature Fund
 1986 Award of the German Film Critics for Best Feature Film Edvige Scimitt
 1989 election of the Theater Today magazine for the best young playwright
 1989 Berne Film Award for the movie The Wild Man
 1991 Award of the Hans-Erich-Nossack price
 1992 Gerhart Hauptmann Prize for The alphabets
 1994 Award for The Rich Friend
 1995 Award of the Goethe Institute for the alphabets
 1996 Aargauer Literature
 2000 Literature Prize of the City of Bern
 2002 Award of the German-language literature Commission Bern
 2002 Swiss Schiller Foundation, individual works prize
 2006 Solothurner Literaturpreis
 2006 Swiss Schiller Foundation individual works prize
 2006 Literature Prize of the Canton of Bern
 2009 Prix Femina Étranger

Works

Prose 
 Max. Roman. München: Ullstein, 1982
 Prinz Hans. Roman. München 1984; Ullstein, 1987, 
 ErSieEs. Roman. München 1986
 Piraten. Roman. Frankfurt am Main: Luchterhand Literaturverlag, 1991, 
 Der dicke Dichter. Roman. Bruckner & Thünker, Basel/Köln 1995
 Das lose Glück. Roman. Ammann Verlag, Zürich, 1999
 Ein neuer Nachbar. Erzählungen. Ammann, Zürich 2002, 
 Maurice mit Huhn. Roman. Ammann, Zürich 2006, 
 paperback edition: Fischer, Frankfurt am Main 2008, 
 Auf Reisen. Erzählung. Ammann, Zürich 2008,  
 Lieber Niels. Wallstein, Göttingen 2011, 
 Der Mann mit den zwei Augen. Wallstein, Göttingen 2012, 
 Die strengen Frauen von Rosa Salva. Wallstein, Göttingen 2014, 
 Die Wolken waren groß und weiß und zogen da oben hin. Wallstein, Göttingen 2016, 
 Ein Sommer mit Proust. Wallstein, Göttingen, 2017,

Theater 
 Elefanten können nicht in die Luft springen, weil sie zu dick sind – oder wollen sie nicht. Kiepenheuer, Berlin 1983 (UA Berlin 1986)
 Brut. Kiepenheuer, Berlin 1986 (UA Bonn 1988)
 Die Alphabeten. Kiepenheuer, Berlin: Kiepenheuer-Bühnenvertriebs-GmbH, 1990; (UA Bern 1994)
 Der reiche Freund. Kiepenheuer, Berlin 1994 (UA Hannover 1995)
 Die Exzentrischen. Kiepenheuer, Berlin 1997, Gustav Kiepenheuer Bühnenvertriebs-GmbH
 Die Einladung. Kiepenheuer, Berlin: Kiepenheuer Bühnenvertriebs-GmbH, 2000; (UA Genf 2006)
 Die singende Kommissarin. Kiepenheuer, Berlin, Kiepenheuer Bühnenvertriebs-GmbH, 2001; (UA Berlin 2002)
 Raghadan. Kiepenheuer, Berlin 2005 (unaufgeführt)

Films
 Edvige Scimitt, 1985
 Der wilde Mann, 1988
 Erhöhte Waldbrandgefahr, 1996

References

1954 births
Writers from Bern
Living people
Swiss dramatists and playwrights
Prix Femina Étranger winners